The 1958 edition of Mitropa Cup was unofficial and only for this tournament was named Danube Cup. The tournament  was won by the Yugoslavs of Crvena Zvezda.

Round of 16
May 25 & June 1, 1958

|}

Quarter-finals
June 1 & 15, 1958

|}

Semi-finals
June 22 & 28, 1958

|}

Finals
July 6 & 12, 1958

|}

References

1958
1957–58 in European football
1957–58 in Bulgarian football
1957–58 in Czechoslovak football
1957–58 in Hungarian football
1957–58 in Romanian football
1957–58 in Yugoslav football
May 1958 sports events in Europe
June 1958 sports events in Europe
July 1958 sports events in Europe